Borrby is a locality situated in Simrishamn Municipality, Skåne County, Sweden with 930 inhabitants in 2010.

References

External links 
 Borrby.com
 Borrby.se

Populated places in Skåne County
Populated places in Simrishamn Municipality